Rebosio is an Italian surname. Notable people with the surname include:

Edgardo Rebosio (1914–?), Italian footballer
Miguel Rebosio (born 1976), Peruvian footballer

Italian-language surnames